Never Say Die may refer to:

Other uses
 Never Say Die (memoir), a 1961 memoir by Jack Hawkins
 Never Say Die (novel), a 2017 novel in the Alex Rider series by Anthony Horowitz

Film and television
 Never Say Die (1920 film), British film by Walter Forde
 Never Say Die (1924 film), a film featuring Douglas MacLean
 Never Say Die (1939 film), a romantic comedy starring Bob Hope and Martha Raye
 Never Say Die (1950 film), or Don't Say Die, British comedy film 
 Never Say Die (1988 film), a New Zealand action film
 Never Say Die (2017 film), a Chinese film
 Never Say Die (TV series), a 1970 British comedy television series produced by Yorkshire Television
 "Never Say Die", an episode of the TV series Diagnosis: Murder

Music
 Never Say Die! Tour, a 1978 tour by Black Sabbath
 Impericon Never Say Die! Tour, an annual European metalcore musical tour

Albums
 Never Say Die!, a 1978 album by Black Sabbath
 Never Say Die (Petra album), 1981
 Never Say Die: Live, a 2000 album by Waylon Jennings & The Waymore Blues Band, or the title song
 Never Say Die, an album by The Undead, or the title song (see below)
 Never Say Die (video), a 1986 video by Black Sabbath
 Never Say Die: The Final Concert, a 2000 concert film featuring Waylon Jennings
Never Say Die, a 2021 album by Wig Wam

Songs
 "Never Say Die" (Black Sabbath song), 1978
 "Never Say Die" (Chvrches song). 2018
 "Never Say Die" (Jon Bon Jovi song), 1991
 "Never Say Die" (The Undead song), 1985
 "Never Say Die" (The 69 Eyes song), 2007
 "It's All Too Much"/"Never Say Die", a 2009 single by Yui
"Never Say Die", a song by Wig Wam from Never Say Die
 "Never Say Die", a song by Europe from Out of This World
 "Never Say Die", a song by Marianas Trench from Astoria
 "Never Say Die", a song by the Monkey Hangerz on the single "Poolie Pride"
 "Never Say Die", a song by Sleigh Bells from Reign of Terror
 "Never Say Die (Give a Little Bit More)", a 1983 song by Cliff Richard from Silver

Other
 Never Say Die (horse) (1951–1975), Thoroughbred racehorse